The 31st Blue Dragon Film Awards ceremony was held on November 26, 2010, at the National Theater of Korea in Seoul. It was broadcast on KBS2 and was hosted by actors Lee Beom-soo and Kim Hye-soo.

Nominations and winners
Complete list of nominees and winners:

(Winners denoted in bold)

References

2010 film awards
Blue Dragon Film Awards
2010 in South Korean cinema